Lazarsfeld is a surname. Notable people with the surname include:

 Paul Lazarsfeld (1901–1976), Austrian-American sociologist
 Robert Lazarsfeld (born 1953), American mathematician
 Sophie Lazarsfeld (1881–1976), Austrian-American therapist and writer